In enzymology, a methylitaconate Δ-isomerase is an enzyme that catalyzes the chemical reaction

methylitaconate  2,3-dimethylmaleate

Hence, this enzyme has one substrate, methylitaconate, and one product, 2,3-dimethylmaleate.

This enzyme belongs to the family of isomerases, specifically those intramolecular oxidoreductases transposing C=C bonds.  The systematic name of this enzyme class is methylitaconate Delta2-Delta3-isomerase. This enzyme is also called methylitaconate isomerase.  This enzyme participates in c5-branched dibasic acid metabolism.

References

 

EC 5.3.3
Enzymes of unknown structure